Lupoto Mine may refer to
 Lupoto Mine (north), a copper mine in Katanga, DRC being developed by Tiger Resources
 Lupoto Mine (Kalumines), a copper mine in Katanga, DRC being developed by TEAL